Darya Blashko (born 28 January 1996) is a Ukrainian biathlete. She has competed in the Biathlon World Cup since 2019.

Results

World Championships
1 medal (1 bronze)

References

External links

1996 births
Living people
Ukrainian female biathletes
Belarusian female biathletes
Biathlon World Championships medalists
Sportspeople from Vitebsk Region